La Robla is a municipality located in the province of León, Castile and León, Spain. According to the 2020 census (INE), the municipality has a population of 3,752 inhabitants.

The area around La Robla was once an important mining community. The train route from La Robla to Bilbao was essential to the development of trade in the region. There is now a luxury passenger train service that travels along the narrow-gauge railway visiting tourist spots along the way .

Demography of La Robla

References

External links
 La Robla Train

Municipalities in the Province of León